Tom Ricketts was one of the eight nominees of the Leader of the Opposition to the Senate of Fiji after the 2006 elections.

On 4 January 2008, Ricketts was appointed Interim Minister for Tourism Trade and Communications after Interim Prime Minister Frank Bainimarama's 2008 Cabinet Reshuffle.

References 

Ethnic minority members of the Senate (Fiji)
Living people
Year of birth missing (living people)
Place of birth missing (living people)
Fiji Labour Party politicians
Fijian people of British descent
Government ministers of Fiji